Rooftops is a 1989 American crime and dance musical drama film directed by Robert Wise, which follows the misadventures of two homeless teenagers in Manhattan.

Rooftops was the last theatrical motion picture directed by Wise and the second of his films about poor young New Yorkers, the first being the famous West Side Story.

Plot summary
Squeak, the main character's best friend has tagged the wrong place and a local crew of misfits seeks to teach him a lesson. A chase ensues through the streets of New York City, through abandoned buildings and on rooftops. Squeak is finally cornered before his best friend and the film's main hero, T, comes to his rescue. The rest of the film focuses on T and his group of friends, among them a reformed prostitute, a young woman, and a deaf basketball player.

T is famous among the neighbourhood for taking place in a dance called "combat" in which "combatants" attempt to force each other off of a square fighting surface through only intimidation, no contact is allowed. T falls in love with Elana and she reciprocates his feelings. T is also exposed to Capoeira, which he naturally compares to his own fighting style.
 
The main antagonists are a group of drug dealers who are slowly taking over the city's abandoned buildings, stringing out the local youth and establishing themselves as the law of the streets. Squeak crosses the drug dealers and pays for it with his life. The rest of the movie follows T and his friends quest for redemption at the hands of the drug dealers, and ends in a climactic rooftop battle.

Cast
 Jason Gedrick as "T"
 Troy Beyer as Elena
 Eddie Velez as "Lobo"
 Tisha Campbell-Martin as Amber
 Alexis Cruz as "Squeak"
 Allen Payne as Kadim
 Steve Love as Jackie "Sky"
 Rafael Baez as Raphael
 Jaime Tirelli as Officer Rivera
 Luis Guzmán as Martinez
 Millie Tirelli as Squeak's Mother
 Robert LaSardo as "Blade"
 Jay Boryea as Willie
 Rockets Redglare as Carlos
 Edouard DeSoto as Angelo
 Bruce Smolanoff as "Bones"
 Edythe Jason as Lois
 Paul Herman as Jimmy
 Lauren Tom as Audry
 Stuart Rudin as Wino
 Coley Wallace as Lester
 Herb Kerr III as Jorge
 Kurt D. Lott as "Zit"
 Peter Lopez as "Burn"
 Jed James as "X"

Critical reception
The film was not well-received by critics. The film has a composite score of 10% on Rotten Tomatoes from 20 reviews. Roger Ebert opined that the film was unrealistic and sugarcoated the grim realities facing homeless teenagers.

Soundtrack
The music credits included the title song "Rooftops" performed by Jeffrey Osborne, "Avenue D" performed by Etta James featuring David A. Stewart, and Bullet Proof Heart written and produced by Grace Jones.

Home media release
Rooftops was first released on VHS and Laserdisc in 1989 by International Video Entertainment.

Platinum Disc released the film onto DVD in 2002, but the DVD was in full screen and did not contain any bonus material. That DVD has since been discontinued.

The current DVD is a double feature release with A Midsummer Night's Rave.

References

External links
 
 
 

1989 films
1989 drama films
1980s musical drama films
American dance films
American independent films
American musical drama films
American romantic drama films
American romantic musical films
Films about homelessness
Films directed by Robert Wise
Films scored by Michael Kamen
Films set in Manhattan
Films set in New York City
Films with screenplays by Allan A. Goldstein
1980s English-language films
1980s American films